The kraken is a legendary sea monster of enormous size said to appear off the coasts of Norway.

Kraken, the subject of sailors' superstitions and mythos, was first described in the modern era in a travelogue by Francesco Negri in 1700. This description was followed in 1734 by an account from Dano-Norwegian missionary and explorer Hans Egede, who described the kraken in detail and equated it with the hafgufa of medieval lore. 

However, the first description of the creature is usually credited to the Norwegian bishop Pontoppidan (1753). Pontoppidan was the first to describe the kraken as an octopus (polypus) of tremendous size, and wrote that it had a reputation for pulling down ships. The French malacologist Denys-Montfort, of the 19th century, is also known for his pioneering inquiries into the existence of gigantic octopuses.

The great man-killing octopus entered French fiction when novelist Victor Hugo (1866) introduced the  octopus of Guernsey lore, which he identified with the kraken of legend. This led to Jules Verne's depiction of the kraken, although Verne did not distinguish between squid and octopus.

Linnaeus may have indirectly written about the kraken. Linnaeus wrote about the Microcosmus genus (an animal with various other organisms or growths attached to it, comprising a colony). Subsequent authors have referred to Linnaeus's writing, and the writings of Bartholin's cetus called hafgufa, and Paullini's monstrous marinum as "krakens". 

That said, the claim that Linnaeus used the word "kraken" in the margin of a later edition of Systema Naturae has not been confirmed.

Etymology 

The English word "kraken" (in the sense of sea monster) derives from Norwegian kraken or krakjen, which are the definite forms of krake.

According to a Norwegian dictionary, krake, in the sense of "malformed or crooked tree" originates from Old Norse kraki, meaning "pole, stake". And krake in the sense of "sea monster" or "octopus" may share the same etymology. Swedish krake for "sea monster" is also traced to krake meaning "pole".

However Finnur Jónsson remarked that the krake also signified a grapnel or anchor, which readily conjured up the image of a cephalopod. He also explained the synonym of krake, namely horv, was an alternative form of  'harrow' and conjectured that this name was suggested by the inkfish's action of seeming to plow the sea.

Shetlandic krekin for "whale", a taboo word, is listed as etymologically related.

Some of the synonyms of krake given by Erik Pontoppidan were, in Danish: , .

The form krabbe also suggests an etymological root cognate with the German verb krabbeln, 'to crawl’.

First descriptions 

The first description of the krake as "sciu-crak" was given by Italian writer Negri in Viaggio settentrionale (Padua, 1700), a travelogue about Scandinavia. The book describes the sciu-crak as a massive "fish" which was many-horned or many-armed. The author also distinguished this from a sea-serpent.

The kraken was described as a many-headed and clawed creature by Egede (1741)[1729], who stated it was equivalent to the Icelanders' hafgufa, but the latter is commonly treated as a fabulous whale. Erik Pontoppidan (1753) who popularized the kraken to the world noted that it was multiple-armed according to lore, and conjectured it to be a giant sea-crab, starfish or a polypus (octopus). Still, the bishop is considered to have been instrumental in sparking interest for the kraken in the English-speaking world, as well as becoming regarded as the authority on sea-serpents and krakens.

Although it has been stated that the kraken was "described for the first time by that name" in the writings of Erik Pontoppidan, bishop of Bergen, in his Det første Forsøg paa Norges naturlige Historie "The First Attempt at [a] Natural History of Norway" (1752–53), a German source qualified Pontoppidan to be the first source on kraken available to be read in the German language. A description of the kraken had been anticipated by Hans Egede.

Denys-Montfort (1801) published on two giants, the "colossal octopus" with the enduring image of it attacking a ship, and the  "kraken octopod", deemed to be the largest organism in zoology. Denys-Montfort matched his "colossal" with Pliny's tale of the giant polypus that attacked ships-wrecked people, while making correspondence between his kraken and Pliny's monster called the arbor marina. Finnur Jónsson (1920) also favored identifying the kraken as an inkfish (squid/octopus) on etymological grounds.

Egede 
The krake (English: kraken) was described by Hans Egede in his Det gamle Grønlands nye perlustration (1729; Ger. t. 1730; tr.

According to his Norwegian informants, the kraken's body measured many miles in length, and when it surfaced it seemed to cover the whole sea, and "having many heads and a number of claws". With its claws it captured its prey, which included ships, men, fish, and animals, carrying its victims back into the depths.

Egede conjectured that the krake was equitable to the monster that the Icelanders call hafgufa, but as he has not obtained anything related to him through an informant, he had difficuty describing the latter.

According to the lore of Norwegian fishermen, they can mount upon the fish-attracting kraken as if it were a sand-bank ( 'fishing shoal'), but if they ever had the misfortune to capture the kraken, getting it entangled on their hooks, the only way to avoid destruction was to pronounce its name to make it go back to its depths. Egede also wrote that the  krake fell under the general category of "sea spectre" ( [søe]-), adding that "the Draw" (definite form) was another being within that sea spectre classification.

Hafgufa 

Egede also made the aforementioned identification of krake as being the same as the hafgufa of the Icelanders, though he seemed to have obtained the information indirectly from medieval Norwegian work, the Speculum Regale (or King's Mirror).

Later  in Historie von Grönland (History of Greenland, 1765) also reported kraken and the hafgufa to be synonymous.

An English translator of the King's Mirror in 1917 opted to translate hafgufa as kraken.

And the hafgufa from the 13th-century Old Norse work continues to be identified with the kraken in some scholarly writings, and if this equivalence were allowed, the kraken-hafgufa's range would extend, at least legendarily, to waters approaching Helluland (Baffin Island, Canada), as described in Örvar-Odds saga.

Contrary opinion
The description of the hafgufa in the King's Mirror suggests a garbled eyewitness account of what was actually a whale, at least to some opinion.  also reads the work as describing the hafgufa as a type of whale.

Finnur Jónsson (1920) having arrived at the opinion that the kraken probably represented an inkfish (squid/octopus), as discussed earlier, expressed his skepticism towards the standing notion that the kraken originated from the hafgufa.

Pontoppidan 
Erik Pontoppidan's Det første Forsøg paa Norges naturlige Historie (1752, actually volume 2, 1753) made several claims regarding kraken, including the notion that the creature was sometimes mistaken for a group of small islands with fish swimming in-between, Norwegian fishermen often took the risk of trying to fish over kraken, since the catch was so plentiful (hence the saying "You must have fished on Kraken").

However, there was also the danger to seamen of being engulfed by the whirlpool when it submerged, and this whirlpool was compared to Norway's famed Moskstraumen often known as "the Maelstrom".

Pontoppidan also described the destructive potential of the giant beast: "it is said that if [the creature's arms] were to lay hold of the largest man-of-war, they would pull it down to the bottom".

Kraken  purportedly exclusively fed for several months, then spent the following few months emptying its excrement, and the thickened clouded water attracted fish. Later Henry Lee commented that the supposed excreta may have been the discharge of ink by a cephalopod.

Taxonomic identifications 

Pontoppidan wrote of a possible specimen of the krake, "perhaps a young and careless one", which washed ashore and died at Alstahaug in 1680. He observed that it had long "arms", and guessed that it must have been crawling like a snail/slug with the use of these "arms", but got lodged in the landscape during the process. 20th century malacologist Paul Bartsch conjectured this to have been a giant squid, as did literary scholar Finnur Jónsson.

However, what Pontoppidan actually stated regarding what creatures he regarded as candidates for the kraken is quite complicated.

Pontoppidan did tentatively identify the kraken to be a sort of giant crab, stating that the alias krabben best describes its characteristics.

However, further down in his writing, compares the creature to some creature(s) from Pliny, Book IX, Ch. 4: the sea-monster called arbor, with tree-branch like multiple arms, complicated by the fact that Pontoppidan adds another of Pliny's creature called rota with eight arms, and conflates them into one organism. Pontoppidan is suggesting this is an ancient example of kraken, as a modern commentator analyzes.

Pontoppidan then declared the kraken to be a type of polypus (octopus) or "starfish", particularly the kind Gesner called Stella Arborescens, later identifiable as one of the northerly ophiurids or possibly more specifically as one of the Gorgonocephalids or even the genus Gorgonocephalus.

This ancient arbor (admixed rota and thus made eight-armed) seems an octopus at first blush but with additional data, the ophiurid starfish now appears bishop's preferential choice.

The ophiurid starfish seems further fortified when he notes that "starfish" called "Medusa's heads" (caput medusæ; pl. capita medusæ) are considered to be "the young of the great sea-krake" by local lore. Pontoppidan ventured the 'young krakens' may rather be the eggs (ova) of the starfish. Pontopiddan was satisfied that "Medusa's heads" was the same as the foregoing starfish (Stella arborensis of old), but "Medusa's heads" were something found ashore aplenty across Norway according to von Bergen, who thought it absurd these could be young "Kraken" since that would mean the seas would be full of (the adults). The "Medusa's heads" appear to be a Gorgonocephalid, with Gorgonocephalus spp. being tentatively suggested.

In the end though, Pontoppidan again appears ambivalent, stating "Polype, or Star-fish [belongs to] the whole genus of Kors-Trold ['cross troll'], .. some that are much larger, .. even the very largest.. of the ocean", and concluding that "this Krake must be of the Polypus kind". By "this Krake" here, he apparently meant in particular the giant polypus octopus of Carteia from Pliny, Book IX, Ch. 30 (though he only used the general nickname "ozaena" 'stinkard' for the octopus kind).

 Denys-Montfort 

In 1802, the French malacologist Pierre Denys-Montfort recognized the existence of two "species" of giant octopuses in Histoire Naturelle Générale et Particulière des Mollusques, an encyclopedic description of mollusks.

The "colossal giant" was supposedly the same as Pliny's "monstrous polypus", which was a man-killer which ripped apart shipwrecked people and divers. Montfort accompanied his publication with an engraving representing the giant octopus poised to destroy a three-masted ship.

Whereas the "kraken octopus", was the most gigantic animal on the planet in the writer's estimation, dwarfing Pliny's "colossal octopus"/"monstrous polypus", and identified here as the aforementioned Pliny's monster, called the arbor marinus.

Montfort also listed additional wondrous fauna as identifiable with the kraken.
 There was Paullini's monstrum marinum glossed as a sea crab, which a later biologist has suggested to be one of the Hyas spp. It was also described as resembling Gesner's Cancer heracleoticus crab alleged to appear off the Finnish coast. von Bergen's "" (meaning 'vastest-of-all sea-beast'), namely the trolwal ('ogre whale', 'troll whale') of Northern Europe, and the Teufelwal ('devil whale') of the Germans follow in the list.

 Angola octopus, pictured in St. Malo 
It is in his chapter on the "colossal octopus" that Montfort provides the contemporary eyewitness example of a group of sailors who encounter the giant off the coast of Angola, who afterwards deposited a pictorial commemoration of the event as a votive offering at St. Thomas's chapel in Saint-Malo, France. Based on that picture, Montfort drew a "colossal octopus" attacking a ship, and included the engraving in his book. However, an English author recapitulating Montfort's account of it attaches an illustration of it, which was captioned: "The Kraken supposed a sepia or cuttlefish", while attributing Montfort.

Hamilton's book was not alone in recontextualizing Montfort's ship-assaulting colossal octopus as a kraken, for instance, the piece on the "kraken" by American zoologist Packard.

The Frenchman Montfort used the obsolete scientific name Sepia octopodia but called it a pouple, which means "octopus" to this day; meanwhile the English-speaking naturalists had developed the convention of calling the octopus "eight-armed cuttle-fish", as did Packard and Hamilton, even though modern-day speakers are probably unfamiliar with that name.

 Warship  Ville de Paris 

Having accepted as fact that a colossal octopus was capable of dragging a ship down, Montfort made a more daring hypothesis. He attempted to blame colossal octopuses for the loss of ten warships under British control in 1782, including six captured French men-of-war. The disaster began with the distress signal fired by the captured ship of the line Ville de Paris which was then swallowed up by parting waves, and the other ships coming to aid shared the same fate. He proposed, by process of elimination, that such an event could only be accounted for as the work of many octopuses.
But it has been pointed out the sinkings have simply been explained by the presence of a storm, and Montfort's involving octopuses as complicit has been characterized as "reckless falsity".

It has also been noted that Montfort once quipped to a friend, DeFrance: "If my entangled ship is accepted, I will make my 'colossal poulpe' overthrow a whole fleet".

 Niagara 
The ship Niagara on course from Lisbon to New York in 1813 logged a sighting of a marine animal spotted afloat at sea. It was claimed to be  in length, covered in shells, and had many birds alighted upon it.

Samuel Latham Mitchill reported this, and referencing Montfort's kraken, reproduced an illustration of it as an octopus.

 Linnaeus's microcosmus 

The famous Swedish 18th century naturalist Carl Linnaeus in his Systema Naturae (1735) described a fabulous genus Microcosmus a "body covered with various heterogeneous [other bits]".

Linnaeus cited four sources under Microcosmus, namely: Thomas Bartholin's cetus (≈whale) type hafgufa; Paullin's monstrum marinum aforementioned; and Francesco Redi's giant tunicate (Ascidia) in Italian and Latin.

According to the Swedish zoologist Lovén, the common name kraken was added to the 6th edition of Systema Naturae (1748), which was a Latin version augmented with Swedish names (in blackletter), but such Swedish text is wanting on this particular entry, e.g. in the copy held by NCSU. It is true that the 7th edition of 1748, which adds German vernacular names, identifies the Microcosmus as  "sea-grape", referring to a cluster of cephalopod eggs.

Also, the Frenchman Louis Figuier in 1860 misstated that Linnaeus included in his classification a cephalopod called  "Sepia microcosmus" in his first edition of Systema Naturae (1735). Figuier's mistake has been pointed out, and Linnaeus never represented the kraken as such a cephalopod. Nevertheless, the error has been perpetuated by even modern-day writers.

 Linnaeus in English 

This was added as a species Sepia octopusa [sic.] by William Turton in his English version of Linnaeus's System of Nature, together with the account of the  armed octopuses.

The trail stemming from Linnaeus, eventually leading to such pieces on the kraken written in English by the naturalist James Wilson for the Blackwood's Edinburgh Magazine in 1818 sparked an awareness of the kraken among 19th century English, hence Tennyson's poem, "The Kraken".

 Iconography 

As to the iconography, Denys-Montfort's engraving of the "colossal octopus" is often shown, though this differs from the kraken according to the French malacologist, and commentators are found characterizing the ship attack representing the "kraken octopod". also remarks on the pictorial representation of the kraken to "the giant Cephalopods embracing a tall ship in his huge arms, aiming to swallow it", though the work cited is Sonnini de Manoncourt, Suites à Buffon.

And after Denys-Monfort's illustration, various publishers produced similar illustrations depicting the kraken attacking a ship.

Whereas the kraken was described by Egede as having "many Heads and a Number of Claws", the creature is also depicted to have spikes or horns, at least in illustrations of creatures which commentators have conjectured to be krakens. The "bearded whale" shown on an early map (pictured above) is conjectured to be a kraken perhaps (cf. §Olaus Magnus below). Also, there was an alleged two-headed and horned monster that beached ashore in Dingle, Co. Kerry, Ireland, thought to be a giant cephalopod, of which there was a picture/painting made by the discoverer. He made a travelling show of his work on canvas, as introduced in a book on the kraken.

 Olaus Magnus 

While Swedish writer Olaus Magnus did not use the term kraken, various sea-monsters were illustrated on his famous map, the Carta marina (1539). Modern writers have since tried to interpret various sea creatures illustrated as a portrayal of the kraken.

Olaus gives description of a whale with two elongated teeth ("like a boar's or elephant's tusk") to protect its huge eyes, which "sprouts horns", and although these are as hard as horn, they can be made supple also. But the tusked form was named "swine-whale", and the horned form "bearded whale" by Swiss naturalist Gesner, who observed it possessed a "starry beard" around the upper and lower jaws. At least one writer has suggested this might represent the kraken of Norwegian lore.

Another work commented less discerningly that Olaus's map is "replete with imagery of krakens and other monsters".

Ashton's Curious Creatures (1890) drew significantly from Olaus's work and even quoted the Swede's description of the horned whale. But he identified the kraken as a cephalopod and devoted much space on Pliny's and Olaus's descriptions of the giant "polypus", noting that Olaus had represented the kraken-polypus as a crayfish or lobster in his illustrations,  and reproducing the images from both Olaus's book and his map. In Olaus book, the giant lobster illustration is uncaptioned, but appears right above the words "De Polypis (on the octopus)", which is the chapter heading. Hery Lee was also of the opinion that the multi-legged lobster was a misrepresentation of a reported cephalopod attack on a  ship.

The legend in Olaus's map fails to clarify on the lobster-like monster "M", depicted off the island of Iona. However, the associated writing called the Auslegung adds that this section of the map extends from Ireland to the "Insula Fortunata". This "Fortunate Island" was a destination on St. Brendan's Voyage, one of whose adventures was the landing of the crew on an island-sized monstrous, as depicted in a 17th century engraving (cf. figure right); and this monstrous fish, according to Bartholin was the aforementioned hafgufa, which has already been discussed above as one of the creatures of lore equated with kraken.

 Giant squid 
The piece of squid recovered by the French ship Alecton in 1861, discussed by Henry Lee in his chapter on the "Kraken", would later be identified as a  giant squid, Architeuthis by A. E. Verrill.

After a specimen of the giant squid, Architeuthis, was discovered by Rev. Moses Harvey and published in science by Professor A. E. Verrill, commentators have remarked on this cephalopod as possibly explaining the legendary kraken.

 Paleo-cephalopod
An ancient, giant cephalopod resembling the legendary kraken has been proposed as responsible for the deaths of ichthyosaurs during the Triassic Period.  This theory has met with severe criticism.

 Literary influences 

The French novelist Victor Hugo's Les Travailleurs de la mer (1866, "Toilers of the Sea") discusses the man-eating octopus, the kraken of legend, called pieuvre by the locals of the Channel Islands (in the Guernsey dialect, etc.). Hugo's octopus later influenced Jules Verne's depiction of the kraken in Twenty Thousand Leagues Under the Sea, though Verne also drew on the real-life encounter the French ship Alecton had with what was probably a giant squid. It has been noted that Verne indiscriminately interchanged kraken with calmar (squid) and poulpe (octopus).

In the English-speaking world, examples in fine literature are Alfred Tennyson's 1830 irregular sonnet The Kraken, references in Herman Melville's 1851 novel Moby-Dick (Chapter 59 "Squid"),

 In popular culture 

Although fictional and the subject of myth, the legend of the Kraken continues to the present day, with numerous references in film, literature, television, and other popular culture topics.

Examples include: John Wyndham's novel The Kraken Wakes (1953), the Kraken of Marvel Comics, the 1981 film Clash of the Titans and its 2010 remake of the same name, and the Seattle Kraken professional ice hockey team. Krakens also appear in video games such as Sea of Thieves, God of War II and Return of the Obra Dinn. The kraken was also featured in two of the Pirates of the Caribbean movies, primarily in the 2006 film, Pirates of the Caribbean: Dead Man's Chest, as the pet of the fearsome Davy Jones, the main antagonist of the film. The kraken also makes an appearance in the film's sequel, At World's End''.

See also
 Akkorokamui
 Cetus
 Cthulhu
 Globster

Explanatory notes

References

Citations

Bibliography

 
 
 
 ; alt text (Vol. 102) via Biodiversity Heritage Library
  digital copy@National Library Norway. [ modern typeset reprint] (1926) A.W. Brøggers boktrykkeris forlag.
  digital copy@National Library Norway
 
 
 
  . Plate XXX (The Kraken): "The Kraken supposed a sepia or cuttle fish (from Denys Montfort)", p. 326a via Biodiversity.
 
 
 
 
 
 
 
 
 
  digital copy@National Library Norway

External links

 The King's Mirror (See Chapter XII)

Monster
Mythological cephalopods
Scandinavian legendary creatures
Sea monsters